Esaete is a genus of beetle in the family Cerambycidae. Its only species is Esaete rufulus. It was described by Galileo and Martins in 2002.

References

Pteropliini
Beetles described in 2002